Cychropsis weigeli is a species of ground beetle in the subfamily of Carabinae. It was described by Deuve & Schmidt in 2007.

References

weigeli
Beetles described in 2007